Scout X-2 was an American expendable launch system and sounding rocket which was flown twice in 1962. It was a four-stage rocket, based on the earlier Scout X-1, uprated first and third stages. It was a member of the Scout family of rockets.

The Scout X-2 used an Algol 1D first stage, instead of the earlier Algol 1B used on the Scout X-1. The third stage was the Antares 2A, a more powerful version of the Antares 1A used on earlier variants of the Scout rocket. The second and fourth stages were the same as those used on the Scout X-1; a Castor 1A and an Altair 1A respectively.

The first Scout X-2 was launched on a suborbital flight at 07:27 GMT on 29 March 1962. It flew from Launch Area 3 of the Wallops Flight Facility. The second flight, launched on 26 April, carried the Solrad 4B satellite. It failed to reach orbit. Following this launch, the Scout X-2 was replaced by the upgraded Scout X-2M.

References

 

1962 in spaceflight
X-2